Yıldız Kaplan (born October 28, 1970, Bafra, Turkey) is a Turkish actress, fashion model, and pop singer.

Biography
She was born in Bafra, Samsun Province in 1970. Although she is mainly a model and singer, she has also acted in a number of films and TV series.

Discography 
Gönül Borcu (2002) (September 10, 2002)
Işıl Işıl (2005) (June 10, 2005)
Motive (2008) (July 11, 2008)
Aşk Dili (2011) (May 27, 2011)

Filmography 
Yapma Diyorum (2009)
Evli ve Çocuklu (2004)
İnşaat (2003)
Evli ve Çocuklu TV (2003)
Asayiş Berkemal (2002)
Bizim Otel (2001)
Hemşo (2000)
Parça Pinçik (2000)
Unutabilsem (1998)
Yasemin (1997)
Tatlı Kaçıklar TV (1997)

References

1970 births
Actresses from Istanbul
Turkish film actresses
Turkish television actresses
Turkish female models
Turkish pop singers
Living people
Singers from Istanbul
20th-century Turkish actresses
21st-century Turkish singers
21st-century Turkish women singers